Cape Hansen is a cape which separates Marshall Bay and Iceberg Bay on the south coast of Coronation Island, in the South Orkney Islands, Antarctica. The name appears on a chart based upon a running survey of the islands in 1912–13 by Petter Sørlle, a Norwegian whaling captain.

Important Bird Area
The site has been identified as an Important Bird Area (IBA) by BirdLife International because it supports a large breeding colony of about 13,000 pairs of chinstrap penguins, as well as a few pairs of brown skuas among the penguins.

References

Coronation Island
Hansen, Cape
Important Bird Areas of Antarctica
Seabird colonies
Penguin colonies